Kallipalayam is a village in Vengarai panchayat of Namakkal district in Tamil Nadu, India. Kallipalayam is part of Kongu Nadu located on the banks of River Kaveri. Around 500 families peacefully live in this village. Agriculture and transport are major businesses in this village. Mr. C. V. Velappan was born in this village. He was the sitting MLA in the Kabilarmalai constituency during M. G. Ramachandran's administration.

References 

Villages in Namakkal district